Scopula concurrens is a moth of the family Geometridae. It was described by Warren in 1897. It is endemic to Zambia.

References

Moths described in 1897
concurrens
Moths of Africa
Endemic fauna of Zambia
Taxa named by William Warren (entomologist)